Teretia policarinarum is an extinct species of sea snail, a marine gastropod mollusk in the family Raphitomidae.

Description

Distribution
Fossils of this marine species were found in Pliocene strata off Málaga, Spain.

References

 Vera-Peláez, J.L. (2002) Revisión de la familia Turridae, excepto Clavatulinae (Gastropoda, Prosobranchia) en el Plioceno de lascuencas de Estepona, Malaga y Velez Malaga (Malaga, S Espana) con la descripcion de 26 especiesnuevas. Pliocenica, Publicaciones del Museo Municipal Paleontológico de Estepona, 2, 176–262

External links
 Morassi M. & Bonfitto A. (2015). New Indo-Pacific species of the genus Teretia Norman, 1888 (Gastropoda: Raphitomidae). Zootaxa. 3911(4): 560-570 
 

policarinarum
Gastropods described in 2002